The Audie Award for Young Listeners' Title is one of the Audie Awards presented annually by the Audio Publishers Association (APA). It awards excellence in narration, production, and content for a children's audiobook intended for children up to the age of 8 released in a given year. From 2004 to 2015 it was given as the Audie Award for Children's Title for Ages Up to Eight. Before 2004 it was given as the Audie Award for Children's Title for Ages Zero to Seven. It has been awarded since 2001, when it was separated from the more expansive Audie Award for Children's Title.

Winners and finalists

2000s

2010s

2020s

References

External links 

 Audie Award winners
 Audie Awards official website

Young Listener Audiobook
Awards established in 2004
English-language literary awards